Wellington Girls' College was founded in 1883 in Wellington, New Zealand. At that time it was called Wellington Girls' High School. Wellington Girls' College is a year 9 to 13 state secondary school, located in Thorndon in central Wellington.

History
Seeing a need for higher education for girls the founding fathers of Wellington College leased a building in Abel Smith Street in 1882 and appointed Miss Martha Hamilton as the Lady Principal of the school. It opened on 2 February 1883 with 40 students. 
However, by the end of its first year the roll increased to almost 100 girls, and when the Premier, the Rt. Hon. Robert Stout visited the school in 1884 the building was overcrowded with 130 students. As a result of his visit the school was moved to its current site in Pipitea Street.

In 1925 the Wellington East Girls' College was established to serve the southern and eastern suburbs.

Notable alumnae

The arts
 Fleur Adcock – poet
 Isobel Andrews – playwright, novelist, short-story writer and poet
 Sylvia Ashton-Warner – writer, poet and educator
 Vidyamala Burch – writer and mindfulness teacher
Joe Cotton – pop singer
 Anne French – editor and poet
 Rebecca Gibney – actor
 Robin Hyde – poet, novelist, biographer and journalist
 Annabel Langbein – celebrity cook, food writer and publisher
 Katherine Mansfield – writer
 Elizabeth McRae – actor
 Marjory Nicholls – poet
 Anna Paquin – actor
 Beverley Randell – children's author
 Jo Randerson – writer, playwright, theatre director and performer
 Fran Walsh – screenwriter and film producer
 Bridget Williams – publisher

Public service
 Nellie Coad – teacher, community leader, writer
Cathy Dewes – Māori language advocate, educator
 Luamanuvao Winnie Laban – politician
 Margaret Shields – politician

Science and medicine
 Elaine Gurr – doctor
Helen Deem – doctor
Theodora Clemens Hall – doctor
 Ocean Mercier – scientist
 Marion Robinson – professor of nutrition
 Dianne Sika–Paotonu - immunologist

Sports
 Gina Crampton – netball player
 Beth Jurgeleit – hockey player
 Jackie Kiddle – rower
 Trish McKelvey – cricketer
 Melissa Moon – athlete
 Thamsyn Newton – cricketer
 Rebecca Perrott – swimmer
 Jade Wilson – squash player

Notable staff 
 Airini Beautrais – poet
 Edith Searle Grossmann – novelist and journalist
 Edith Howes – writer and educationalist

Principals

References

Educational institutions established in 1883
Girls' schools in New Zealand
Secondary schools in the Wellington Region
Schools in Wellington City
1883 establishments in New Zealand
Alliance of Girls' Schools Australasia